Pedicularis rainierensis is a species of flowering plant in the family Orobanchaceae commonly known as Mount Rainier lousewort. It is endemic to the vicinity of Mount Rainier in Washington state.

References

Sources

External links
USDA Plants Profile
Photo gallery

rainierensis
Mount Rainier
Endemic flora of Washington (state)
Flora without expected TNC conservation status